Mediavia grenvilalis is a species of snout moth in the genus Mediavia. It was described by Schaus in 1934. It is found in Brazil.

References

Moths described in 1934
Epipaschiinae